Ecteinomyces is a genus of fungi in the family Laboulbeniaceae.

References

External links
Ecteinomyces at Index Fungorum

Laboulbeniomycetes